Hajdúnánás is a district in north-western part of Hajdú-Bihar County. Hajdúnánás is also the name of the town where the district seat is found. The district is located in the Northern Great Plain Statistical Region. This district is a part of Hajdúság historical and geographical region.

Geography 
Hajdúnánás District borders with Tiszavasvári District (Szabolcs-Szatmár-Bereg County) to the north, Hajdúböszörmény District to the southeast, Balmazújváros District to the south, Mezőcsát District and Tiszaújváros District (Borsod-Abaúj-Zemplén County) to the west. The number of the inhabited places in Hajdúnánás District is 6.

Municipalities 
The district has 2 towns and 4 villages.
(ordered by population, as of 1 January 2012)

The bolded municipalities are cities.

Demographics

In 2011, it had a population of 29,614 and the population density was 54/km².

Ethnicity
Besides the Hungarian majority, the main minorities are the Roma (approx. 1,000) and German (100).

Total population (2011 census): 29,614
Ethnic groups (2011 census): Identified themselves: 26,934 persons:
Hungarians: 25,755 (95.62%)
Gypsies: 851 (3.16%)
Others and indefinable: 328 (1.22%)
Approx. 3,000 persons in Hajdúnánás District did not declare their ethnic group at the 2011 census.

Religion
Religious adherence in the county according to 2011 census:

Catholic – 6,698 (Roman Catholic – 6,141; Greek Catholic – 555);
Reformed – 6,463;
other religions – 268; 
Non-religious – 8,833; 
Atheism – 219;
Undeclared – 7,133.

Gallery

See also
List of cities and towns of Hungary

References

External links
 Postal codes of the Hajdúnánás District

Districts in Hajdú-Bihar County